Talayeh Ashrafi (born July 24, 1984) known professionally as Tala Ashe, is an Iranian-American actress. She is known for her roles on the television series Smash, American Odyssey, and As the World Turns, as well as her regular role as Zari Tomaz and Zari Tarazi on The CW superhero series Legends of Tomorrow.

Early life and education 
Ashe was born in Tehran, Iran. She immigrated to the United States when she was nine months old. Ashe grew up in Powell, Ohio, just outside of the state capital Columbus. She participated in her high school theatre productions as both an actress and director.

Ashe received a BFA from Boston University's School of Theatre. She also trained at the London Academy of Music and Dramatic Art and the Upright Citizens Brigade Theatre in New York City.

Career 
Ashe has performed in numerous regional and Off-Broadway stage productions. Ashe's first screen credit is for her role as Nadia in the 2008 film Waiting in Beijing. She was credited as Tala Ashrafi, but is credited as Tala Ashe in all subsequent roles. She has made guest appearances on the series Law & Order, Law & Order: Criminal Intent, 30 Rock, and Covert Affairs. Ashe has also had recurring roles on Smash and American Odyssey. She was also a cast member on As the World Turns.

In 2017, Ashe joined the main cast of Legends of Tomorrow as Zari Tomaz. She took the lead for a bottle episode titled "Here I Go Again" and drew praise from critics and fans alike for her performance.

Personal life 
Ashe is Iranian-American and holds dual citizenship. Her name, Talayeh, means "pioneer" in Persian and comes from the Shahnameh. In addition to English, she speaks fluent Persian. Along with her fellow Arrowverse actresses, Ashe is a founding member of Shethority, a project aimed at inspiring and uplifting women (inclusively defined).

Filmography

Stage 
In addition to the following, Ashe has also performed in productions of Love's Labour's Lost (as Tala Ashrafi; Huntington Theatre Company), Age of Innocence (New York Arena), Autophagy (Drama League Director's Project), Twelfth Night (Actors' Shakespeare Project), and Pearls from Salt (Olney Theatre), among others.

References

External links 
 

Living people
Iranian television actresses
People from Powell, Ohio
Boston University College of Fine Arts alumni
Alumni of the London Academy of Music and Dramatic Art
Actresses from Tehran
21st-century Iranian actresses
American television actresses
Iranian stage actresses
American stage actresses
American Muslims
Iranian emigrants to the United States
21st-century American women
1984 births